is a former Japanese football player and manager he is the currently first-team coach J1 League club of FC Tokyo.

Playing career
Amma was born in Hamamatsu on May 23, 1969. After graduating from Komazawa University, he joined Honda in 1992. He was selected MVP awards in 1999 Japan Football League. He retired in 2001.

Coaching career
After retirement, in 2002, Amma became a manager for Honda. In first season, the club won the champions in Japan Football League. In 2003 and 2004, the club won the 2nd place.

In 2005, he moved to J2 League club Ventforet Kofu and served as assistant coach under manager Takeshi Oki. In 2008, Amma became a manager as Oki successor. He managed Ventforet until 2009.

In 2010, he moved to J2 club Kataller Toyama and became an assistant coach under manager Hiroshi Sowa. In September 2010, Sowa was sacked for poor performance and Amma became a new manager. However the club results were bad every season and was finally relegated to J3 League in 2014 season. He resigned end of 2014 season.

In 2015, he moved to FC Tokyo and became an assistant coach. He also managed FC Tokyo U-23 in 2016. In September 2017, top team manager Yoshiyuki Shinoda was sacked and Amma became a new manager. In 2018, he returned to an assistant coach for top team and manager for FC Tokyo U-23.

Managerial statistics

References

External links

1969 births
Living people
Komazawa University alumni
Association football people from Shizuoka Prefecture
Japanese footballers
Japan Football League (1992–1998) players
Japan Football League players
Honda FC players
Japanese football managers
J1 League managers
J2 League managers
J3 League managers
Ventforet Kofu managers
Kataller Toyama managers
FC Tokyo U-23 managers
FC Tokyo managers
FC Gifu  managers
Association football midfielders